Don or Donald Parker may refer to:

Donald C. Parker (1939–2015), American astronomer
Donald E. Parker (born before 1980), American psychologist
Don Parker (racing driver) (1908–1997), British racing driver
Don Parker (American football), from List of Virginia Cavaliers in the NFL Draft
Donn B. Parker (born before 1952), American information technology specialist